The women's 100 metres hurdles event at the 2015 Asian Athletics Championships was held on June 3.

Medalists

Results

Heats
First 2 in each heat (Q) and the next 2 fastest (q) qualified for the final.

Wind:Heat 1: -0.4 m/s, Heat 2: +0.6 m/s

Final
Wind: -0.4 m/s

References

100
Sprint hurdles at the Asian Athletics Championships
2015 in women's athletics